Alogonia may refer to:

Alogonia (moth), a moth
Alogonia (town), an ancient town of Messenia
Alogonia (ship), a British steamship